Undercurrent is a flow of water below the surface:
In an ocean, a subsurface current, a water current which flows beneath and usually independently of surface currents.
In a river, a subsurface current (see whitewater)
It may also refer to:

Books
 Undercurrent (newspaper), a Canadian newspaper
 Undercurrent (manga), a 2005 manga by Tetsuya Toyoda
The Undercurrent (novel), by Robert Grant (writer)

Film and TV
 The Undercurrent (1919 film), a 1919 American drama film directed by Wilfrid North
 Undercurrent (1946 film), a film directed by Vincente Minnelli, starring Katharine Hepburn
 Undercurrent, an alternate title for the 1956 Japanese film Night River
 Undercurrent, a 1999 film starring Lorenzo Lamas
 Undercurrent (2010 film), an Icelandic film, starring Gísli Örn Garðarsson
 Undercurrent: The Disappearance of Kim Wall, a 2022 HBO documentary on the Murder of Kim Wall, by Erin Lee Carr
 "Undercurrent", a 1976 episode of The Onedin Line

Music
 Undercurrent (Kenny Drew album), a 1960 album by pianist Kenny Drew
 Undercurrent (Bill Evans and Jim Hall album), a 1962 album by pianist Bill Evans and guitarist Jim Hall
 Undercurrent (Sarah Jarosz album), a 2016 album by Sarah Jarosz
 Undercurrent (Matisyahu album), a 2017 album by Matisyahu
 The Undercurrent (album), a 2008 album by French band Scarve

See also
 Undercurrents (disambiguation)